Paul Karl Heinrich Klinksik (14 June 1907, Essen – 14 November 1971, Munich) was a German stage and film actor who also worked in radio drama and soundtrack dubbing.

Family life
His father, a civil engineer, was Karl Heinrich Klinksik; his mother was Gertrud Emma Mathilde (née) Uhlendahl. He was first married from 1936 to 1945 to the actress Hildegard Wolf with whom he had one child.  There were two more children from his second marriage in 1950 to Karin Anderson, another actress. Paul Klinger and Karin Andersen, twenty years his junior, met during the filming of a crime thriller in 1950 when she was working on the set as a stills photographer.  They would later appear together in two of the Immenhof films, Hochzeit auf Immenhof, 1956 and Ferien auf Immenhof, 1957.

Education and career

Klinger's secondary education was at the Helmholtz-Realgymnasium, which he attended to Abitur level taking part in amateur dramatic productions with his friend, Helmut Käutner. However, his father was opposed to any idea of a career in the theatre and sent him to the Technische Hochschule München (Technical University Munich), where he once again met up with his old school friend Helmut Käutner.  The latter persuaded him to change from architecture to a theatrical course. He completed six semesters, he and his friend working as extras at the Otto-Falckenberg Schauspielhaus.  The death of his father meant that he could no longer afford to study and he accordingly decided to become a professional actor.

Theatre
One of his first engagements was at the Bayerische Landesbühne (a travelling theatre) – and from 1929 at theatres in Koblenz, Oldenburg, Düsseldorf and Breslau – where his powerful and distinctive voice landed him major parts for which he was really too young. Things were to change in 1933 when the director Heinz Hilpert took him to the Deutsches Theater in Berlin, where he was cast in the roles of young heroes, as was the case with a production of Uta von Naumberg in which he appeared with Käthe Dorsch. He would remain in theatre in Berlin until 1948, appearing not only at the Deutsches Theater but also at the Komische Oper, the Theater am Kurfürstendamm, the Hebbeltheater, the Schloßpark-Theater and in comedy.

Early films
In Breslau, under the direction of his cousin, Karl-Heinz Uhlendahl, he passed some television screen tests and began his film career in 1933 with Du sollst nicht begehren (Thou Shalt not Covet), which landed him simultaneous contracts with the then biggest German studios Ufa, Terra Film and Tobis. His second film was Männer vor der Ehe in 1936, this to be followed by numerous roles in other films. As for his film work during the period of the Third Reich, the theatrical director Hellmuth Matiasek commented: "His appearance and manner – evoking pre-war salons rather than the trenches of the Eastern Front – spared him from productions commissioned by Joseph Goebbels and he played in classics by Goethe, Theodor Storm and Fontane." A short film made early in the war, Barbara, did not get past the censor: in this he played the soldier husband of Lotte Werkmeister.  However, when he was sent to the front, his wife would find fulfilment with a job on the railway. In the NS-inspired war film, Spähtrupp Hallgarten, directed by Herbert B Fredersdorf, Klinger comes across as boyish, eye-winking and at times foolhardy.

Post war films
He had other film parts after the Second World War, reaching the peak of his popularity in the 1950s in films of Erich Kästner novels such as Anna Louise and Anton and The Flying Classroom, as well as others in the Heimatfilm genre of the Immenhof trilogy. In the latter, Klinger, in the role of Jochen von Roth, is an amiable, substitute father-figure who manages to turn the impoverished farm into a successful pony-trekking centre.

Dubbing
As early as 1943, Klinger was involved in film dubbing. In the 1950s and 60s he was one of the busiest dubbing actors in the German film industry, speaking the parts of many well known actors including Charlton Heston, Bing Crosby (12 times), Jean Gabin, Cary Grant, Humphrey Bogart, Stewart Granger, William Holden and Tyrone Power.

TV and radio
From the early 1960s, he was seen less frequently on the big screen but embarked on a television career where he became known to a wide audience in the six-part WDR blockbuster,  by Francis Durbridge, and the ZDF police series, Kommissar Brahm.

In addition to his work for theatre, film and television, Klinger appeared from 1940 onwards in numerous German radio dramas. In 1967 he took over the title role, which had been played by René Deltgen, in the twelfth and final episode of the famous Paul Temple radio series, Paul Temple und der Fall Alex (Paul Temple and the Alex Affair) by Francis Durbridge.  Like almost all the other broadcasts in the series, this WDR production was released on a CD.  In the eleventh episode (1966) Paul Temple und der Fall Genf(Paul Temple and the Geneva Mystery), he was heard not in the title role but as Maurice Lonsdale.

Death and honours
Paul Klinger, who appeared in over 70 films, died in Munich on 14 November 1971 from a heart attack while he was attending a meeting of the Bundesfachgruppe der Film- und Fernsehschaffenden of the Deutsche Angestellten-Gewerkschaft.  He is buried in the cemetery at Söcking near Starnberg.

In 1974, the non-profit association ‘Paul-Klinger-Künstlersozialwerk e.V.’ (Paul Klinger Artist Welfare-Aid Foundation) was founded to honour his work for disadvantaged artists.

On the anniversary of his birth in 2007, Germany honoured Paul Klinger with a commemorative postage stamp that had a print-run of ten million.  The stamp was launched at a ceremony on 14 June 2007 by the Paul-Klinger-Künstlersozialwerkes e.V. at Höhenried Castle on Lake Starnberg in the presence of his family and former colleagues, the latter including Sonja Ziemann, Ernst Stankovski, Kurt Weinzierl, Mady Rahl und Eva-Ingeborg Scholz.

A road is named after him in his birthplace, Essen.  It is located in the Essen-Westviertel district, close to the Colosseum Theatre on land where once stood factory premises of the firm Friedrich Krupp AG.

Selected filmography

1933: Du sollst nicht begehren (Blut und Scholle) as Lutz, der Soldat
1935: Liebesleute
1936: Männer vor der Ehe as Fritz Hallborn - Kaufmann
1936: Fridericus as von Bonin
1937:  as Ludwig Krüll
1937: Crooks in Tails as Conny Parker
1937: Zweimal zwei im Himmelbett as Veit Schöpflin
1937: Adventure in Warsaw as Henry de Fontana - Gesandtschaftsrat
1938: Wie einst im Mai as Georg von Uhlendorff
1938: Großalarm as Paul Köppen
1938: Narren im Schnee as Toni Notnagel
1938: Zwei Frauen as Werner Bruck
1938: Verliebtes Abenteuer as Tom
1938:  as Bartel Vierköttel
1939: Ich bin gleich wieder da as Nicolas Mohr
1939: Morgen werde ich verhaftet as Dr. Walter Felden
1939: Sommer, Sonne, Erika as Werner Meck
1940: Commissioner Eyck as Günter Eyck, Kriminalkommissar
1940: Herzensfreud – Herzensleid as Paul, beider Sohn
1940: Alarm as Herbert Flügger
1941: Spähtrupp Hallgarten as Sepp Eberle
1942: Erbin vom Rosenhof as Mathias Summerer
1942: Die goldene Stadt as Ingenieur Christian Leidwein
1943: Back Then  as Pablo (voice, uncredited)
1943: Circus Renz as Harms
1943: Immensee as Erich Jürgens
1943:  as Ludwig Termöhlen - beider Sohn
1944: Seinerzeit zu meiner Zeit as Reichling
1944: Das Leben ruft as Paul Warkentin
1944: The Green Salon as Wolf Termöhl, cand.arch.
1947: Marriage in the Shadows as Hans Wieland
1948: Everything Will Be Better in the Morning as Dr. Axel Robert, Rundfunk-Regisseur
1949: Encounter with Werther as Albert
1949: Don't Play with Love as Walter Ulrich / Wupp
1950: Ich glaube an Dich (Mathilde Möhring) as Hans Ribbeck (Premiere 1950)
1950: Vier Treppen rechts (Zimmer zu vermieten as Dr. Jürgen Wenter (Premiere 1950)
1950: Sensation in Savoy as Andreas Behrend
1950:  as Herr Heinrich Böckmann
1951: Falschmünzer am Werk as Inspektor Braun
1951: Geheimnis einer Ehe (Talent zum Glück) as Paul Brugger
1951:  as Kurt May - Architekt
1951: Das späte Mädchen
1952: Don't Ask My Heart as Paul Gerber
1952: Mikosch Comes In as Tibor von Köröd
1952: At the Well in Front of the Gate as Kurt Kramer
1953: Prosecutor Corda as Hans Neidhard
1953: Anna Louise and Anton as Herr Pogge
1953: When the White Lilacs Bloom Again as Peter Schroeder
1953: Wedding in Transit as Herr von Rupp
1954: Rose-Girl Resli as Dr. Schumann
1954: The Seven Dresses of Katrin as Dr. Peter Schörg
1954: The Flying Classroom as Der Nichtraucher
1954: Bon Voyage as Mr. van Mühlen
1955: The Immenhof Girls as Jochen von Roth
1955: Operation Sleeping Bag as Hauptmann Brack
1955: My Leopold as Rudolf Starke
1955: Son Without a Home as Dr. Friedlieb
1955: Lost Child 312 as Dr. Richard Gothe
195?: Hände und Hebel as Narrator
1956: The Bath in the Barn as Bürgermeister Hendrick
1956:  as Georg Hochleitner
1956:  as Jochen von Roth
1956: The Old Forester House as Paul Kramer
1957: Glücksritter as Peter Harmsen
1957:  as Jochen von Roth
1958: South Seas Adventure as Supplemental Narrator (German Version) (voice)
1958:  as Geistlicher
1958:  as Albert Horn
1958: Sebastian Kneipp as Dr. Baumgarten
1959: Rommel Calls Cairo as Field Marshal Erwin Rommel
1961:  as Dr. Günther Behrens
1963:  (TV Series) as Dr. Killick
1963: The White Spider as Inspector Dawson
1963: Jack and Jenny as Jonas
1963: Unterm Birnbaum (adapted from Theodor Fontane) (TV Movie) as Justizrat Vohwinkel
1963: Der Parasit (TV Movie) as Narbonne
1964:  as Inspektor Cromwell
1964: Das Kriminalmuseum (TV Series) as Herbert Forster
1964: Paul Klinger erzählt abenteuerliche Geschichten (TV Series short)
1964:  as Tompson
1965: Red Dragon as Norman
1966: Conan Doyle und der Fall Fdalji (TV Movie) as Sir Arthur Conan Doyle
1966-1967: Familie Hansen (TV Series) as Axel Hansen
1967: Kommissar Brahm (TV Series) as Kommissar Brahm
1969: Tagebuch eines Frauenmörders (TV Movie) as Kriminalrat Rose
1970: Pim, Pam und Pummelchen as Narrator
1970: Dreißig Silberlinge  (TV Movie) as Mr. Hammeker
1971: Kirsch und Kern (TV Movie) as Otto Kern
1971: Hochwürden drückt ein Auge zu as Narrator (uncredited)
1971: ...und heute heißt es Show as Singer

Radio drama
 1946: Torquato Tasso (adapted from Johann Wolfgang von Goethe) – Director: Hannes Küpper
 1946: Tobby - Director: Hanns Korngiebe
 1947: Schicksalswende – Director: Hanns Korngiebel
 1948: Der Mann mit dem Splitter - Director: unknown
 1952: Sieg über das Dunkel (Filmmitschnitt) - Director: unknown
 1952: Wehe dem, der nichts geleistet hat – Director: Eduard Hermann
 1952: They never come back – Author: Kurt Brumme – Director: Hermann Pfeiffer 
 1955: Der Fremde kam um Mitternacht – Director: Peter Glas
 1957: Die Büchse Münchhausens – Director: Egon Monk
 1958: Der schwarze Schwan – Director: Erich Köhler
 1960: Die Galoschen des Unglücks – Director: Raoul Wolfgang Schnell
 1960: Das Gartenfest – Director: Peter Schulze-Rohr
 1962: Die verlorene Stimme – Director: Otto Kurth
 1963: Der Entartete – Director: Hans Lietzau
 1963: Das Steckenpferd – Director: Otto Kurth
 1963: Zwischenfall beim Maskenball – Director: Hermann Pfeiffer
 1963: Ein blinder Spiegel – Director: :Friedhelm Ortmann
 1963: Der Reifenstecher – Director: Manfred Brückner
 1964: Tistou mit dem grünen Daumen – Director: Robert Bichler
 1964: Durch die Wüste (adapted from Karl May) – Director: Manfred Brückner
 1965: Ellen – Director: Heinz-Günter Stamm
 1965: Noch eine Nacht – Director: Rolf von Goth
 1965: Die Glocken von Bicêtre – Director: Gert Westphal
 1965: Das ist nicht in Tedeles Sinn – Director: Manfred Brückner
 1965: Der Berg – Director: Miklós Konkoly
 1965: Die Prinzessin und die Hexe – Director: Leopold Reinecke
 1966: Heinrich Schliemann – Director: Hermann Pfeiffer
 1966: Paul Temple und der Fall Genf – Director: Otto Düben
 1966: Heimgefunge – Regie: Heinz Dieter Köhler
 1966: Konsultation – Director: not stated
 1967: Gespräche im All – Director: Ulrich Lauterbach
 1967: Modell meiner kleinen Stadt – Director: Jiri Horcicka
 1967: Die Marne bei Charenton – Director: Klaus Mehrländer
 1968: Paul Temple und der Fall Alex – Director: Otto Düben
 1968: Schlafwagenabteil – Director: Peter Albrecht Stiller
 1968: Spaziergang im Park – Director: Oswald Döpke
 1969: Die Fünf-Uhr-Marquise – Director: Otto Düben
 1969: Die Parzen – Director: Hermann Wenninger
 1972: Professor Mancinis Geheimnis – Director: Ulrich Lauterbach

Notes

External links 
 
 Paul Klinger at virtual-history.com
 The filmography and list of radio dramas is taken from the German Wikipedia at :de:Paul Klinger

1907 births
1971 deaths
Actors from Essen
People from the Rhine Province
German male film actors
German male television actors
German male voice actors
German male radio actors
20th-century German male actors
Technical University of Munich alumni